Saint Catherine of Siena Receiving the Stigmata is an oil on canvas painting by Domenico Beccafumi, executed c. 1515, now in the Pinacoteca Nazionale di Siena.

The first masterpiece of the artist's maturity, it was originally in the now-destroyed Olivetan monastery outside the Porta Tufi. It is dated on stylistic grounds. The predella was removed around the time of Della Valle before being recovered in the Padre Generale's apartments. The whole work was restored by the Florentine Gagliardi in 1830.

References

Paintings of Catherine of Siena
1515 paintings
Paintings in the Pinacoteca Nazionale (Siena)
Paintings by Domenico Beccafumi
Paintings of Jerome
Paintings of Benedict of Nursia